An Australian national cricket team captained by Ian Craig toured New Zealand between February and April 1957. They played 12 matches, seven of which were first-class, including three matches against New Zealand, but these were not granted Test status. The Australians won one and drew two of the international matches, and won the other four first-class matches.

Team

 Ian Craig (captain)
 Richie Benaud
 Peter Burge
 John Drennan
 Les Favell
 Ron Gaunt
 Neil Harvey
 Barry Jarman
 Lindsay Kline
 Johnny Martin
 Ian Meckiff
 Norm O'Neill
 Bob Simpson
 Bill Watson

It was a young team: Craig was 21; the oldest player, Harvey, was 28; and the youngest player, O'Neill, was 19.

Matches
Australia won the first game against Canterbury by five wickets. Benaud took four wickets and Burge scored a century.

The next game against Southland was drawn. Southland were dismissed for 84, Gaunt taking 6-23. Favell scored 81 and Watson 74.

Australia beat Otago by an innings and 102 runs. Harvey scored 161 and Kline took six wickets and Meckiff five.

Australia beat a combined team from Ashburton County, South Canterbury and North Otago by an innings and 18 runs, Meckiff taking 8-19 in the first innings.

First Unofficial Test
Australia played a New Zealand team, a match that ended in a draw. Craig scored 123 not out in the second innings.

Australia beat Wairarapa by an innings.

Second Unofficial Test
In the second game against New Zealand they drew, Benaud taking 6-79.

A match against Poverty Bay was a draw, despite Benaud and Harvey scoring centuries.

Australia beat Auckland by an innings and 54 runs, Meckiff taking nine wickets.

They drew with Waikato, Martin taking five wickets. Australia beat Central Districts by ten wickets, Benaud scoring a century and taking eight wickets.

Third Unofficial Test
In the third and final unofficial test, Australia beat New Zealand by ten wickets. Meckiff and Benaud took six wickets for the game, Martin took seven and Norm O'Neill scored a century.

Neil Harvey headed the batting aggregates in first class games with 448 runs at 49.77. Benaud took 32 wickets at 19.31.

References

External links
 Australia in New Zealand 1956-57 at CricketArchive

Further reading
 Don Neely & Richard Payne, Men in White: The History of New Zealand International Cricket, 1894–1985, Moa, Auckland, 1986, pp. 259–62
 Wisden 1958, pp. 846–52

1957 in Australian cricket
1957 in New Zealand cricket
New Zealand cricket seasons from 1945–46 to 1969–70
1956-57
International cricket competitions from 1945–46 to 1960